The gilt-edged tanager (Tangara cyanoventris) is a species of bird in the family Thraupidae. It is endemic to Brazil.

Its natural habitats are subtropical or tropical moist lowland forest, subtropical or tropical moist montane forest, and heavily degraded former forest.

References

Birds of the Atlantic Forest
Tangara (genus)
Birds described in 1819
Endemic birds of Brazil
Taxa named by Louis Jean Pierre Vieillot
Taxonomy articles created by Polbot